Sancho de Londoño (1515?–1569) was a Spanish soldier and military writer.

Works
 Discurso sobre la forma de reducir la disciplina a mejor y antiguo estado (Brussels, 1589)
 Libro del arte militar (Valencia, 1596)

1569 deaths
Spanish military writers
Spanish people of the Eighty Years' War
Year of birth uncertain